The Scream Awards was an award show dedicated to the horror, sci-fi, and fantasy genres of feature films. Originally only having Scream Queen and Heroic Performance awards for actors, the personnel awards have expanded to include actors and actresses of all three recognized genres. Comic books awards were also given and have been recently expanded. It was broadcast on Spike and has been branded in the past as the Spike TV Scream Awards. Subsequently, the show was relabeled simply Scream with the respective year, i.e. Scream 2009. The show was created by executive producers Michael Levitt, Cindy Levitt, and Casey Patterson.

The Scream Awards ceremonies were discontinued after 2011.

Production
Award coverage includes the year between the previous awards show and the live ceremony in October of each year. The event is recorded on a Saturday evening and is aired on a later Tuesday.

The inaugural ceremony was held at the Pantages Theatre on October 7, 2006. From 2007 to 2010, it was held at the Greek Theatre in Los Angeles, California. The 2011 ceremony was held at the backlot of Universal Studios.

Live rock acts, including Ozzy Osbourne, Korn, and My Chemical Romance have performed at various ceremonies.

Categories
Originally only having Scream Queen and Heroic Performance awards for actors, the personnel awards have expanded to include actors and actresses of all three recognized genres.  Comic book awards have also been given and have recently been expanded.

Categories include:

 The Ultimate Scream
 Best Horror Movie
 Best Fantasy Movie
 Best Science Fiction Movie
 Best Action Movie
 Best TV Show
 Best Superhero
 Best Comic-to-Screen Adaptation
 Renamed "Best Comic Book Movie" beginning in 2008.
 Most Memorable Mutilation
 Most Vile Villain
 Renamed "Best Villain" beginning in 2008.
 Breakout Performance
 The Scene of the Year Award
 Called one of the alternative titles "Holy Sh!t" or "Jump-From-Your-Seat" in differing years.

Ceremonies

See also
 Saturn Awards

References

Comics awards
American film awards
Mass media science fiction awards
American television awards
Horror fiction awards
Awards established in 2006
Awards disestablished in 2011
Spike (TV network) original programming